The 2011 Baylor Bears football team represented Baylor University in the 2011 NCAA Division I FBS football season. The team was coached by Art Briles and played their home games at Floyd Casey Stadium in Waco, Texas. They are members of the Big 12 Conference. They finished the season 10–3, 6–3 in Big 12 play to finish in a tie for third place with Oklahoma (whom they defeated during the season). The ten wins tied a school record for wins in a season while the 6–3 conference record is its best since joining the Big 12. They were invited to the Alamo Bowl where they beat Washington, 67–56, for their first bowl win since the 1992 John Hancock Bowl.

Junior starting quarterback Robert Griffin III won the Heisman Trophy, becoming the first Baylor player to win the award.

Recruiting
Baylor's recruiting class was ranked #46 by Rivals.com and #50 by Scout.com.

Regular season
Building on the success of the previous year's team, Baylor began the season at home with a 50–48 upset of then #14 TCU, winners of the previous season's Rose Bowl. The Bears won their next two games against Stephen F. Austin and Rice at home, before traveling to Kansas State where they lost a tightly contested game 35–36 to the greatly improved Bill Snyder-coached team.  After defeating Iowa State 49–26 at home, the Bears finished October losing two straight on the road at Texas A&M and eventual conference champion Oklahoma State.

The Bears rebounded to finish the regular season with five straight victories including a Homecoming win over Missouri, a 31–30 overtime victory at Kansas in which Baylor tied a school record by overcoming a 21-point deficit in the 4th quarter, and the program's first win over then #5 Oklahoma on a 34-yard touchdown pass from Griffin to Terrance Williams with 8 seconds remaining in the game. Baylor concluded November in Dallas playing against Texas Tech in Cowboys Stadium; although Griffin left the game due to a concussion at the half, backup Nick Florence entered the game to lead the Bears to a 66–42 victory. Baylor's win over Texas Tech was their first since 1995.

The Bears finished the regular season at home with a 48–24 victory over then #22 Texas that propelled the team (9–3, 6–3 Big 12) to the Alamo Bowl with #12 and #15 BCS and AP rankings respectively. The victory also propelled quarterback Robert Griffin III to the top of the Heisman Trophy voting; he became the first Baylor player to win the award and the first Baylor player since Don Trull in 1963 to factor significantly in the voting.

Schedule

 Game was called at the end of the 3rd quarter due to lightning.

Game summaries

Missouri

Oklahoma

    
    
    
    
    
    
    
    
    
    
    
    
    

Baylor's first victory over Oklahoma in school history.

Texas Tech

Robert Griffin III was knocked out just before halftime with a concussion.

Texas

2011 Alamo Bowl

On December 4, 2011, Baylor accepted an invite to represent the Big-12 in the 2011 Alamo Bowl. Their opponents were the Washington Huskies of the Pac-12. The game was played at the Alamodome.  The crowd of 65,256 represented the 5th largest attendance in the history of the bowl game. A very good showing since the highest ever attendance at an Alamo bowl was only 66,100 which was set several years before.  The Bowl officials stated it was also the most exciting college football game ever witnessed at the Bowl.

The contest became the second-highest scoring bowl game in history, and the highest-scoring regulation bowl game ever. Baylor went up 21–7 early in the game, with Griffin throwing for one touchdown and rushing for another. The Huskies roared back with 28 unanswered points, and the teams finished the half with Washington leading 35–24. In the second half, with the defenses showing limited ability to cope with the high-powered offenses led by Griffin and Husky QB Keith Price, the teams traded scores. The Bears overcame the halftime deficit, going ahead for good 60–56 halfway in the 4th quarter, and Baylor RB Terrance Ganaway tacked on a final 43-yard touchdown run with 2:28 left to play. Ganaway finished with 21 carries for 200 yards and 5 TDs, and was recognized as the game's offensive MVP. The victory represented Baylor's first bowl win since a victory in the John Hancock (Sun) Bowl in 1992. With the win, Baylor had their first 10-win season since 1980.

Awards and honors
 Davey O'Brien Award: Robert Griffin III
 Heisman Trophy: Robert Griffin III
 AP Player of the Year: Robert Griffin III
 Sporting News Player of the Year: Robert Griffin III

Rankings

References

Baylor
Baylor Bears football seasons
Alamo Bowl champion seasons
Baylor Bears football